San Michele Arcangelo may refer to:

 Michael (archangel), an archangel in Judaism, Christianity and Islam
 San Michele Arcangelo ai Corridori di Borgo, a church in Rome, Italy
 San Michele Arcangelo a Pietralata, a  church in Rome, Italy
 San Michele Arcangelo in Sant'Angelo in Lizzola, a church in Lizzola, Italy
 San Michele Arcangelo ai Minoriti, Catania, a church in Catania, Italy
 San Michele Arcangelo, Anacapri, a church in Anacapri, Italy
 San Michele Arcangelo, Antegnate, a church in Antegnate, Italy
 San Michele Arcangelo, Ausonia, a church in Ausonia, Italy
 San Michele Arcangelo, Bolognola, a church in Bolognola, Italy
 San Michele Arcangelo, Contigliano, a church in Contigliano, Italy
 San Michele Arcangelo, Fermo, a church in Fermo, Italy
 San Michele Arcangelo, Grammichele, a church in Grammichele, Italy
 San Michele Arcangelo, Greccio, a church in Greccio, Italy
 San Michele Arcangelo, Marsico Nuovo, a church in Marsico Nuovo, Italy
 San Michele Arcangelo, Montasola, a church in Montasola, Italy
 San Michele Arcangelo, Naples, a church in Naples, Italy
 San Michele Arcangelo, Ostiano, a church in Ostiano, Italy
 San Michele Arcangelo, Paganico, a church in Paganico, Italy
 San Michele Arcangelo, Perugia, a church in Perugia, Italy
 San Michele Arcangelo, Potenza, a church in Potenza, Italy
 San Michele Arcangelo, Rivodutri, a church in Rivodutri, Italy
 San Michele Arcangelo, Sermoneta, a church in Sermoneta, Italy
 San Michele Arcangelo, Scicli, a church in Scicli, Italy
 San Michele Arcangelo, Trecasali, a church in Trecasali, Italy
 San Michele Arcangelo, Verghereto, a church in Verghereto, Italy
 San Michele Arcangelo, Volterra, a church in Volterra, Italy

See also 

 Michele (disambiguation)
 San Michele (disambiguation)
 Collegiata di San Michele Arcangelo (disambiguation)
 Hermitage of San Michele Arcangelo, Pescocostanzo